Richard V. Hourigan (1 April 1939 – 9 November 2002) was a Fine Gael politician from County Limerick in Ireland. He was a senator for most of the years from 1982 to 1992.

He was educated at St Munchin's College, Limerick and later at University College Dublin (UCD). Hourigan had a reputation as a formidable speaker, winning the President's Gold Medal for Oratory while at UCD. Jim Farrelly's Who's Who in Irish Politics, 1990–1991, described Hourigan as "an able, witty speaker who is extremely knowledgeable on farming and on farmer politics".

Hourigan stood unsuccessfully as a Fine Gael candidate for Dáil Éireann in the Limerick East constituency at the 1981 general election. In 1982, he was elected to the 16th Seanad on the Agricultural Panel, and was re-elected in 1983 to the 17th Seanad, serving until the 1987 elections. He was re-elected at the 1989 election to the 19th Seanad, but was defeated at the 1993 Seanad elections, and failed to regain the seat when he stood again in 1997.

References

1939 births
2002 deaths
Fine Gael senators
Members of the 16th Seanad
Members of the 17th Seanad
Members of the 19th Seanad
Politicians from County Limerick
Irish farmers
Alumni of University College Dublin
People educated at St Munchin's College